This list of educational institutions in Gentofte Municipality is a list of educational institutions in Gentofte Municipality, Greater Copenhagen, Denmark. It includes primary, secondary and higher educational institutions.

Secondary education
 Aurehøj Gymnasium
 Gammel Hellerup Gymnasium
 Ordrup Gymnasium
 Øregård Gymnasium

Primary education

Private and charter schools

See also
 List of educational institutions in Lyngby-Taarbæk Municipality

References

Education in Gentofte Municipality